Rhod Gilbert's Work Experience is a British comedy programme produced for BBC One Wales in which stand up comedian Rhod Gilbert attempts various jobs for a limited time (usually a week). Many of the jobs are conducted within his native Wales although some take him further afield to places including Belgium and Yorkshire.

Episodes

Series overview

Broadcast dates sourced from the BBC 
Broadcast dates are for the original broadcast on BBC One Wales and not nationally on either BBC One or BBC Two

Series 1

Series 2

Series 3

Series 4

Series 5

Series 6

Series 7

Series 8

Series 9

References

British comedy television shows
2010s British workplace television series
Documentary television series about industry